The lac Métabetchouane is a fresh body of water crossed by the Métabetchouane River, in the unorganized territory of Lac-Moncouche, in the Lac-Saint-Jean-Est Regional County Municipality, in the administrative region of Saguenay–Lac-Saint-Jean, in the province in Quebec, to Canada. This lake constitutes the demarcation between the Laurentides Wildlife Reserve (east side - administrative region of Saguenay–Lac-Saint-Jean) and zec Kiskissink (west side - administrative region of Mauricie - La Tuque).

The lake Métabetchouane is indirectly served by the route 155 (connecting La Tuque and Chambord). A few secondary forest roads serve this area for the purposes of forestry and recreational tourism activities.

Forestry is the main economic activity in the sector; recreational tourism, second.

The surface of Métabetchouane Lake is usually frozen from the beginning of December to the end of March, however the safe circulation on the ice is generally made from mid-December to mid-March.

Geography 
The main watersheds near lake Métabetchouane are:
 north side: Métabetchouane River, Chaîne River, Chute River, Fouet River;
 east side: Moncouche River, rivière aux Écorces, Lac aux Écorces;
 south side: Great Bostonnais Lake, Bostonnais River, Kiskissink Lake, Métabetchouane River;
 west side: Commissioners River, Perche river, Croche river.

This lake is mainly fed by the outlet of the Métabetchouane River (coming from the east via Naquagami bay), riverside streams, the outlet of lakes Voisard, Bellevalle and Bohémier, the outlet of lakes Chaunard and Biliette, the outlet of Lac du Sillon and the outlet of Lac Mallette.

The mouth of Métabetchouane Lake is located at the bottom of a bay at the far north of the lake, at:
  north-east of the bottom of a bay in Grand lac Bostonnais;
  north of Kiskissink Lake;
  north-east of the center of the village of Van Bruyssel located along the Canadian National railway;
  east of lac des Commissaires;
  north of the village center of Lac-Édouard;
  south of the mouth of the Métabetchouane river, on the south shore of lac Saint-Jean.

From the mouth of Métabetchouane Lake, the current follows the course of:
 the Métabetchouane river on  generally towards the northwest;
 the Saguenay River via the Petite Décharge on  eastward to Tadoussac where it merges with the Saint Lawrence estuary.

Toponymy 
The toponym "lac Métabetchouane" was formalized on December 5, 1968, by the Commission de toponymie du Québec.

Notes and references

Appendices

Related articles 
 Lac-Saint-Jean-Est Regional County Municipality
 Lac-Moncouche, a TNO
 La Tuque, a city
 Zec Kiskissink, a controlled harvesting zone
 Laurentides Wildlife Reserve
 Métabetchouane River
 Lac Saint-Jean
 Saguenay River
 St. Lawrence River
 List of lakes in Canada

Lakes of Saguenay–Lac-Saint-Jean
Lac-Saint-Jean-Est Regional County Municipality
Laurentides Wildlife Reserve